Fantasea is a word play on fantasy and sea. It may refer to:

Shipping
Fantasea Cruising, operating ferries and water taxis on Sydney Harbour and Pittwater - Taken over by NRMA in 2018.
Fantaseas, a defunct chain of indoor waterparks in the United Kingdom
Fantasea, a 1978 surf movie with Shaun Tomson

Music
Fantasea (mixtape), a mixtape by Azealia Banks